Micromelum minutum, commonly known as limeberry, dilminyin (east Arnhem Land). kimiar margibur (Murray Island), tulibas tilos (Philippines), sesi (Indonesia) and samui (Thailand), is a species of small tree or shrub in the citrus plant family Rutaceae. It occurs from India and Indochina to Australia. It has pinnate leaves with egg-shaped to lance-shaped leaflets, hairy, pale green or creamish, scented flowers arranged in large groups and yellow to orange or red, oval to spherical berries in dense clusters.

Description
Micromelum minutum is a tree that typically grows to a height of  but also flowers and forms fruit as a dense shrub.

Taxonomy
Limeberry was first formally described in 1786 by Georg Forster who gave it the name Limonia minuta and published the description in Florulae Insularum Australium Prodromus.  In 1834, Wight and George Arnott Walker-Arnott changed the name to Micromelum minutum in their book Prodromus Florae Peninsulae Indiae Orientalis.

Distribution and habitat
It also occurs in sandstone gorges and on karst formations far inland. The species occurs in Malesia, New Caledonia, Fiji and northern Australia. In Australia it is found in the Kimberley region of Western Australia, in the northern part of the Northern Territory, and south from the Cape York Peninsula in Queensland. It was recorded in New South Wales prior to 1911.

Ecology
The larvae of some species of butterfly, including the orchard butterfly (Papilio aegeus) and canopus butterfly (Papilio fuscus) use this species as a food source.

Uses
In Malesia and Indonesia, limeberry is used as medicine and the timber is used for construction.

References

Aurantioideae
Flora of New South Wales
Flora of the Northern Territory
Flora of Queensland
Taxa named by Georg Forster
Plants described in 1786